

Legislative Assembly elections

Kerala

|- style="background-color:#E9E9E9; text-align:center;"
! class="unsortable" |
! Political Party !! Flag !! Seats  Contested !! Won !! Net Change  in seats !! % of  Seats
! Votes !! Vote % !! Change in vote % 
|- 
| 
| style="text-align:left;" |Indian National Congress
| 
| 133 || 36 ||  27 || 27.07 || 21,23,660 || 33.55 ||  0.87
|-
| 
| style="text-align:left;" |Communist Party of India
| 
| 79 || 3 ||  28 || 2.26 || 525,456 || 8.3 ||  30.84
|- 
| 
| style="text-align:left;" |Communist Party of India (Marxist)
| 
| 73 || 40 || New || 30.08 || 1,257,869 || 19.87 || New
|- 
| 
| style="text-align:left;" |Kerala Congress
|
| 54 || 23 || New || 17.29 || 796,291 || 12.58 || New
|-
| 
|
| 16 || 6 ||  ||  4.51 || 242,529 || 3.83 || 
|- 
| 
| style="text-align:left;" |Samyukta Socialist Party
|
| 29 || 13 || New || 9.77  || 514,689 || 8.13 || New
|-
| 
|
| 174 || 12 ||  7 || 9.02 || 869,843 || 13.74 || N/A
|- class="unsortable" style="background-color:#E9E9E9"
! colspan = 3|
! style="text-align:center;" |Total Seats !! 133 ( 0) !!  ||Voters !! 6,330,337 !! style="text-align:center;" |
|}

References

External links

 Election Commission of India

1965 elections in India
India
1965 in India
Elections in India by year